"ABCDEFU" (stylized in all lowercase, also known by its radio edited title "ABC") is the major-label debut single by American singer Gayle, released on August 13, 2021, through Atlantic and Arthouse Records. It was co-written by Gayle with Sara Davis and David Pittenger, and produced by Pete Nappi. The song is the lead single from Gayle's debut EP A Study of the Human Experience Volume One.

"ABCDEFU" reached number one on the Billboard Global 200 and peaked at number three on the US Billboard Hot 100. Outside of the United States, "ABCDEFU" topped the charts in Austria, Belgium (Wallonia), Finland, Germany, Iceland, Ireland,  Luxembourg, Malaysia, Norway, Sweden, Switzerland, and the United Kingdom.

In 2022 the song was nominated for Song of the Year for the 65th Annual Grammy Awards.

Background and promotion
The song marks the first single release since the Nashville-based singer signed with Atlantic Records/Arthouse Records in 2021. On her TikTok account, Gayle uploaded a video where she stated "I'm out of [song] ideas" and asked followers to comment song ideas. "Comment anything and I'll try my best to turn it into a song." Nancy Berman, a marketing manager at Atlantic Records  commented asking for a song that incorporates the alphabet. Within a few days, Gayle uploaded another video of her strumming the chorus of the song.

According to Gayle, the song "came from a place of trying so hard to be the nice, respectful ex-girlfriend, to the point where it was negatively affecting me". In an interview with Tongue Tied Mag, Gayle explained the inspiration behind the song: "After the breakup, I was trying really, really hard to be a nice person—like, overcompensating for it—like, the week after we broke up, I called him and was, like, 'Hey, bud!' and 'What's up, my friend?!'". On March 31, 2021, Gayle stated on Instagram that she had dislocated her middle finger, and the X-ray scan from the hospital was used for the single's cover art.

The song achieved mainstream success within a few months after release, surpassing over 500 million global streams as of March 2022. Gayle has since released different versions of the song, including the demo, a "chill version", and an "angrier version".

Music video 
The accompanying music video was released on August 13, 2021. The video was shot via a camcorder at a low resolution to evoke early 2000s home videos. In the music video, the singer and her friends visit and look around her ex's home.

Composition
According to the digital sheet music published at musicnotes.com by Warner Music Publishing, "ABCDEFU" is written in the key of E major with a tempo of 122 beats per minute. The song's title and lyrical content are a play on words incorporating the first six letters of the alphabet with the addition of the twenty-first to form an initialism for the profane phrase Fuck yoU.

Sonically the song is characterized by "minimalistic sonics" and "jagged guitar work", while it "reaches its climax with a massive sing-a-long chorus".

Critical reception
Gayle's song has been a viral hit on platforms such as TikTok and Instagram. Emily Zemler of Rolling Stone praised the passion of Gayle's live renditions of the piece. April Bredael of Tongue Tied Magazine thought the song "adds to a growing list of accomplishments" of the singer with tracks that are "authentic, honest, and unapologetic".

Track listing
Digital download and streaming (Nicer version)
 "ABC"   – 2:48
Digital download and streaming (Demo version) "ABCDEFU"   – 2:35Digital download and streaming (Chill version) "ABCDEFU"   – 2:56Digital download and streaming (Angrier version) "ABCDEFU"   – 2:39Digital download and streaming (featuring Royal & the Serpent) "ABCDEFU"   – 2:49Digital download and streaming (The Wild Remix)'''
 "ABC"   – 3:02

Charts

Weekly charts

Year-end charts

Certifications

Release history

References

2021 singles
2021 songs
Atlantic Records singles
Billboard Global 200 number-one singles
Billboard Global Excl. U.S. number-one singles
Gayle (singer) songs
Irish Singles Chart number-one singles
Number-one singles in Austria
Number-one singles in Finland
Number-one singles in Germany
Number-one singles in Malaysia
Number-one singles in Norway
Number-one singles in Sweden
Number-one singles in Switzerland
Songs written by Gayle (singer)
Ultratop 50 Singles (Wallonia) number-one singles
UK Singles Chart number-one singles